20 August 1955 Stadium, is a multi-use stadium in Skikda, Algeria.  It is currently used mostly for football matches. The stadium holds 30,000 people. It serves as a home ground for JSM Skikda.

See also

List of football stadiums in Algeria
List of African stadiums by capacity
List of association football stadiums by capacity

References

Football venues in Algeria
Skikda Province
Buildings and structures in Skikda Province